is a Japanese surname.

People with the name
, Japanese ski jumper
, Japanese manga artist
, one of the Twenty-four Generals of Takeda Shingen during the Sengoku period
, Japanese manga artist
, World War II Imperial Japanese army general
, Meiji period political leader
, Japanese video game designer, formerly of Tecmo
, Japanese artist and photographer
 Hangaku Gozen, Japanese warrior also called Itagaki
, Japanese actor and former idol M!LK

Fictional characters
, characters from the manga series Hajime no Ippo

Japanese-language surnames